Ray Anthony Jacobs (born August 18, 1972) is a former Canadian football linebacker in the Canadian Football League who played for the Calgary Stampeders, Saskatchewan Roughriders, BC Lions and Ottawa Renegades. He played college football for the North Carolina Tar Heels. He also played in the National Football League for the Denver Broncos.

References

1972 births
Living people
American football linebackers
Canadian football linebackers
Denver Broncos players
Calgary Stampeders players
Saskatchewan Roughriders players
BC Lions players
Ottawa Renegades players
North Carolina Tar Heels football players